Union Councils of Karachi are local governments in Karachi.

Union Council is the primary governmental institution in Pakistan. Headed by a Union Nazim, each union council has 13 elected members or councilors. In addition to four male and two female members elected directly, there are two male and two female representatives of the labor, a minority member, a Union Nazim and his deputy known as Union Naib Nazim. Beside elected members, there are several government employees and functionaries in every union council, who report to the Secretary of the Union Council. The latter is a civil servant appointed by the state.  The territory of a Union Council or Village Council is usually part of a Tehsil (county). Less commonly, a Union Council may be part of a City District.

Union Councils of Karachi 
The following is a list of the union councils of Karachi, and their respective neighbourhoods and suburban localities. Karachi has a total of 18 Towns, and 178 Union councils.

Baldia Town

Bin Qasim Town

Gadap Town

Gulberg Town

Gulshan-e-Iqbal

Jamshed Town

Kemari Town

Korangi Town

Landhi Town

Liaquatabad Town

Lyari Town

Malir Town

New Karachi Town

North Nazimabad Town

Orangi Town

Saddar Town

Shah Faisal Town

S.I.T.E. Town (Sindh Industrial & Trading Estate)

See also
 North Karachi, Khuda ki Basti, Taiser Town

External links 
 Karachi City-District Government
 Town Municipal Administration, Sindh
 Understanding Karachi and the 2015 local elections

Union councils of Sindh
Union councils
Lists of governments